Jordan Michael Hadfield (born 12 August 1987) is an English footballer

Career
Hadfield started his football career with Stockport County but was never offered a contract for first team status and was released.

After being released he joined Macclesfield, even offering to play for free to show his abilities. After one season playing for nothing, Hadfield had convinced the coaching staff he had what it takes to play football at this level and was offered a three-year contract.

Hadfield famously played in Macclesfield Town's 3rd Round FA Cup clash against Chelsea at Stamford Bridge in 2007. The magic of the FA Cup was not to be, and there was no giant killing as Macclesfield were soundly beaten 6–1, despite the heroic efforts of goal keeper Tommy Lee.

Hadfield then posed in the Salford Advertiser that week with the swapped shirt of Frank Lampard.

During the 2006–07 season, Hadfield had the infamy of being placed in the bad boy league of The Sun due to the amount of fouls committed and the bookings he received, not to mention three sendings off that season.

When Paul Ince left Macclesfield Town to take charge of League Two promotion contenders MK Dons, Ince took Hadfield on loan. Unfortunately for Hadfield, he would only make 13 appearances during the promotion winning campaign and returned to Macclesfield.

Hadfield also went on loan to Altrincham.

He was released by Macclesfield at the end of the 2009 season and signed on at Ashton United.

He then signed for Conference Premier team Kettering Town on a non contract basis in January 2010.

He joined Radcliffe Borough in August 2011.

In October 2012 he re-joined former club Ashton United.

References

External links

1987 births
Living people
People from Swinton, Greater Manchester
English footballers
Association football midfielders
Stockport County F.C. players
Macclesfield Town F.C. players
Milton Keynes Dons F.C. players
Altrincham F.C. players
Ashton United F.C. players
Kettering Town F.C. players
Radcliffe F.C. players
Trafford F.C. players
English Football League players
National League (English football) players
Northern Premier League players